Wat Phnom FC, previously known as Spark FC is a football (soccer) club in Phnom Penh, Cambodia. It played in the Metfone C-League, the top division of Cambodian football.

References

Football clubs in Cambodia
Sport in Phnom Penh